Walter John Stoessel Jr. (January 24, 1920 – December 9, 1986) was an American diplomat.

Life and career
Born in Manhattan, Kansas, Stoessel was the son of Katherine (Haston) and Walter John Stoessel Sr. and graduated from Beverly Hills High School in California.  The paternal side of his family had migrated to the United States from western Germany in the middle of 19th century. He graduated from Stanford University in 1941 and later undertook graduate studies at Columbia University.

A career officer of the United States Foreign Service, Stoessel served as the U.S. ambassador to Poland from 1968 to 1972, U.S. Assistant Secretary of State for European and Canadian Affairs from 1972 to 1974, the U.S. ambassador to the Soviet Union between 1974 and 1976, and the ambassador to West Germany from 1976 through 1980.  During his term as ambassador to Poland, Stoessel initiated contact with China and hosted talks on behalf of the United States, directly opening the door for President Richard Nixon's famous visit to China.
In 1981, while ambassador to West Germany, he joined the delegation, with Walter Mondale, greeting the U.S. hostages released by Iran when they deplaned.

In 1982, President Ronald Reagan appointed Stoessel as the United States Deputy Secretary of State.  During his term he served briefly as acting Secretary of State between the tenures of Alexander M. Haig and George P. Shultz.

He died in Washington, D.C., of leukemia and is buried at Arlington National Cemetery.  The U.S. Department of State awards a Walter J. Stoessel Award for Distinguished Diplomatic Service in his honor.

References

External links

1920 births
1986 deaths
United States Deputy Secretaries of State
Ambassadors of the United States to Germany
Ambassadors of the United States to the Soviet Union
20th-century American diplomats
United States Career Ambassadors
Reagan administration personnel
American people of German descent
Politicians from Manhattan, Kansas
Columbia University alumni
Burials at Arlington National Cemetery
Under Secretaries of State for Political Affairs
United States Foreign Service personnel
Acting United States Secretaries of State
Beverly Hills High School alumni
Stanford University alumni
Deaths from leukemia
Deaths from cancer in Washington, D.C.